The Mitchell Madison Group (MMG) is a global management consulting firm based in the United States that focuses on improving financial and operating performance for major corporations and private equity portfolio companies.  It was founded in 1994 and re-launched in 2003. It is active in corporate performance improvement, strategic sourcing, marketing science, pricing optimization, strategy consulting, and big data analysis.

History
The firm was founded in 1994 with about 120 professionals as part of a management buyout by a group of A.T. Kearney partners as A.T. Kearney was in the process of selling itself to IT outsourcing conglomerate EDS.

The firm experienced rapid growth in the 1990s, primarily in its strategic sourcing practice, serving large financial institutions with 16 offices and almost 1,000 employees. The firm was sold in late 1999 for about $300 million to USWeb, a Web design company which expanded during the dot-com bubble into management consulting. Subsequently, USWeb merged with Whitman-Hart, another consulting firm based in Chicago. The combined company was considered a merger of equals and had over 10,000 employees with annual revenues exceeding $1 billion, and soon renamed itself "marchFIRST". With the burst of the dot-com bubble, marchFIRST went into bankruptcy in April 2001 and its assets were liquidated.

In 2003, Hans Dau with other partners, who were running the West Coast offices of the original Mitchell Madison Group, re-launched the firm by acquiring the brand name in bankruptcy court. By 2008, the firm had grown to about 150 employees with main offices on New York, Los Angeles and Manila and several satellite offices in Europe and Asia.

The firm is featured, although not by name, in Matthew Stewart's book The Management Myth. Stewart takes care not to state the name of the firm, but he does say that it was bought out by an Internet company whose CEO was named "Joe" and believed in UFOs.

Business
The Mitchell Madison Group works with large global corporations including private equity firms' portfolio companies on a variety of performance improvement, analytics and strategy issues. Industries served include technology, telecommunications, banking, insurance, entertainment, healthcare, business services, and manufacturing industries. The firm also assists major manufacturing companies with cost reduction initiatives and global strategic sourcing. In March 2011, the company partnered with ProUnlimited a contingent workforce provider, now called Magnit to provide SOW consultancy services to clients. MMG also spun off a separate software subsidiary "MMG Technologies, Inc." that is focussed on commercializing analytical RFP software using a patent pending cost-model technology. MyRFP.com was launched in May 2022 and exhibited for the first time at the Sourcing Industry Conference in October 2022.

Publications

References

External links

International management consulting firms
Privately held companies based in Wyoming
Macroeconomics consulting firms
Management consulting firms of the United States
Research and analysis firms of the United States